The Partido de Bahía Blanca is a partido of the Buenos Aires Province is located at the south-west of the province in central Argentina at coordinates 

The provincial subdivision holds a population of 284,776 inhabitants in an area of 2,300 km² (888 sq mi), and its capital city is Bahía Blanca, on the shore of the Atlantic Ocean.

Sports
The city of Bahía Blanca has a strong sporting tradition. It is home to two  football clubs, Olimpo de Bahía Blanca and Club Villa Mitre (second division).

The city is also well known for its basketball club Estudiantes which is on the Liga Nacional de Basquetbol.

Administrative divisions
Bahía Blanca Partido is subdivided into eleven divisions known as localidades:
 Bahía Blanca 301,531 inhabitants
 General Daniel Cerri 8,716 inhabitants
 Cabildo 2,125 inhabitants
 Grünbein 3,194 inhabitants
 Ingeniero White 10,486 inhabitants
 Villa Bordeu 982 inhabitants
 Villa Espora - Base Aeronaval Comandante Espora 1,604 inhabitants
 Villa Harding Green
 Villa Stella Maris
 Villa Nueva
 Rosendo López 5,000 inhabitants

Settlements
The main towns in Bahia Blanca Partido are, including its population according to the :

 Bahía Blanca, 258,243
 Grünbein, 3,194
 Ingeniero White, 10,486
 Villa Bordeau 982
 Villa Espora - Base Aeronaval  Comandante Espora, 1,604
 Cabildo, 2,125
 General Cerri, 6,515
 Villa Harding Green
 Villa Stella Maris
 Álferez San Martín
 Corti
 Napostá
 La Viticola
 Rural area, 1,627
 Villa Italia [?]

 

 
Partidos of Buenos Aires Province
Populated places established in 1928